Keuthan Aircraft was a US aircraft manufacturer located in Merritt Island, Florida. The firm marketed ultralights in kit form. It ceased business in 1996 and its assets were acquired by Arnet Pereyra Inc.

Companies based in Brevard County, Florida
Defunct aircraft manufacturers of the United States